Lajes Airport  is located in the parish and Vila das Lajes, in the municipality of Praia da Vitória, on Terceira Island, in the Azores.

Overview
Lajes Airport not only serves Terceira but is also a hub providing international access to the Azores. It shares a runway and control and support structures with the military Lajes Field. Its runway is the longest among the airports of the Azores, measuring about 3300 meters in length. Aerogare Civil das Lajes (ACL) has a capacity of 750,000 passengers per year and 360 passengers per hour as of the last requalification.

Airlines and destinations

Accidents
On August 24, 2001, Air Transat Flight 236 suffered from fuel exhaustion over the Atlantic Ocean due to a fuel leak. The pilots diverted to Lajes and landed safely.

Statistics

References

Lajes Airport
Terceira Island
Buildings and structures in Praia da Vitória